Hawthornden or Hawthorndean is an apple cultivar that is used for cooking.  It is also known as Wheeler's Kernel, Lincolnshire Pippin, and Lord Kingston, and has been incorrectly known as Maiden's Blush and Hawley.

References

Apple cultivars
British apples